Surya Rao or Surya Rau may refer to:

 Rao Venkata Kumara Mahipati Surya Rau (1885–1964), Maharajah of Pithapuram
 Surya Prakash Rao (born 1948), Indian cricket umpire
 Kutikuppala Surya Rao (born 1954), Indian physician

See also
 Suryaraopeta, a census town in East Godavari district, Andhra Pradesh, India